Sharpsburg is the name of some places in the United States of America:
Sharpsburg, Georgia
Sharpsburg, Illinois
Sharpsburg, Iowa
Sharpsburg, Kentucky
Sharpsburg, Maryland
The Battle of Antietam, often called the "Battle of Sharpsburg" in the southern United States
Sharpsburg, Missouri
Sharpsburg, Athens County, Ohio
Sharpsburg, Mercer County, Ohio
Sharpsburg, Pennsylvania
Sharpsburg, North Carolina